Syllitus deustus is a species of beetle in the family Cerambycidae. It was described by Newman in 1841.

References

Stenoderini
Beetles described in 1841